Gmina Pacyna is a rural gmina (administrative district) in Gostynin County, Masovian Voivodeship, in east-central Poland.

Villages
Gmina Pacyna contains the villages and settlements of Anatolin, Janówek, Łuszczanówek, Luszyn, Model, Pacyna, Podatkówek, Podczachy, Przylaski, Radycza, Raków, Rakowiec, Remki, Robertów, Romanów, Rybie, Sejkowice, Skrzeszewy, Słomków and Wola Pacyńska.

Neighbouring gminas
Gmina Pacyna is bordered by the gminas of Gąbin, Kiernozia, Oporów, Sanniki, Szczawin Kościelny and Żychlin.

References
Polish official population figures 2006

External links 

Pacyna
Gostynin County